Riverside Olympic Football Club, is a soccer club which represents Launceston in the National Premier Leagues Tasmania. The club also fields 37 teams across all junior divisions. Riverside Olympic play their home games at Windsor Park, in Launceston, Tasmania.

Riverside has teams in the Northern Premier League, Premier League Reserves, Under 18's, Men's Division One and a Women's Team. Riverside Olympic were promoted to the Tasmanian State League in 1993.

Honours
State Championship Runners-up: 1973
Northern Premierships: (7 times) 1973, 1990, 1991, 1992, 1998, 1999, 2018
Steve Hudson Cup Winners: 2013
Steve Hudson Cup Runners-Up: 2008

Seasons - Men

References 

Soccer clubs in Tasmania
Association football clubs established in 1968
1968 establishments in Australia